Seyed Mostafa Mir-Shafiei (b. 6/8/1989) is an Iranian politician. He worked a consultant at Samen pharmacy and Saipa company.

Early life 
Seyed Mostafa Mir-Shafiei was born in Behshahr, in Mazanadaran Province, on August 6th, 1989. He grew up in a religious family. His high school major was mathematics. He earned his bachelor's degree from Golestan University majoring in statistics in 2007 and master's degree from Amirkabir University in Tehran.

Career 
He served as the youth club's representative in Mazandaran Province for Ayatollah Hashemi Rafsanjani at the eleventh government's presidential election. He was appointed as coordination representative for all of Dr. Rohani's clubs in the country. After the presidential election, Rouhani appointed Seyed Mostafa Mir-Shafiei as a consultant. 

After a year, he was dismissed for his objection to Barjam in September 2014. Several days after that, the government deleted the news about Mir-Shafiei in the media and prescribed warrant denial.

References 
The Huffington Post : They accused  Vatanmoh of "treason". Now the  former spiritual adviser moves from one state to another, fearing for his life

1989 births
Living people
Iranian pharmacists
Iranian politicians